Medieval archaeology is the study of humankind through its material culture, specialising in the period of the European Middle Ages. At its broadest, the period stretches from the 5th to the 16th century and refers to post-Roman but pre-modern remains. The period covers the upheaval caused by the Fall of the Western Roman Empire and cultures such as the Vikings, the Saxons, and the Franks. Archaeologists often specialise in studying either the Early Middle Ages (Migration Period) or the High Middle Ages and Late Middle Ages, although many projects and professionals move across these chronological boundaries. The rich nature of the medieval written record means that archaeology has often been seen as the "handmaiden to history", especially in the Late Middle Ages. Analysis of material culture may enrich or call into question written evidence from the medieval period and the two sources of evidence need to be used together. Medieval archaeology has examined the development of medieval settlements, particularly the development of medieval towns, monasteries, and castles. It has also contributed to understanding of the spread and development of Christian monasticism during the medieval period.

History of the study of medieval archaeology
The Society for Medieval Archaeology (United Kingdom) was founded in 1957. To celebrate its 50th anniversary, several publications examined the history of the society and the sub-discipline. Christopher Gerrard's 2003 book Medieval Archaeology also charts the move in the United Kingdom from antiquarianism, through Victorian medievalism, on to the emergence of medieval archaeology as a sub-discipline in the 20th century. Michel de Boüard, the University of Caen, Ecole pratique des Hautes Etudes, and the Polish Academy of Sciences were instrumental in establishing medieval archaeology as a field in France in the second half of the 20th century.

Areas of expertise
The study of medieval archaeology often focuses on specific kinds of settlement pattern.

Rural settlements and landscapes
Pattern of medieval rural settlements are often quite different from modern time villages. This is true in terms of architecture, outline of the settlements and social structure.

Towns
There is a broad spectrum of pre-urban and urban settlements in the Middle Ages (e.g. early medieval trading places at the Northern Sea and the Baltic Sea, former Roman cities and town foundations of the late Middle Ages).

An important field of research is urban archaeology in still existing towns, which is determined by rescue archaeology.

Castles

Castles are medieval fortified structures.

Church and monastic archaeology
In the United Kingdom, the Dissolution of the Monasteries left many monastic sites abandoned. Where monasteries have survived or been converted for other uses, "buildings archaeology" has also been applied to study their history. Medieval monasteries often held large estates and the study of monastic landscapes is an area of specialised research. There have been two main waves of research in medieval monastic and church archaeology: 1970-1995 and 1995-present. The first wave was influenced by landscape history and processual archaeology; scholarship focused principally on historical, economic and technological questions and targeted individual sites and monuments for study. The second wave has been informed by post-processual approaches and considers change and complexity in religious landscapes and perspectives on religious space, embodiment and agency.

See also
Medieval Bioarchaeology

References

Further reading

External links 

Journal "Medieval Archaeology“, digitized version of vols. 1–50 (1957–2006)

Archaeological sub-disciplines
Medieval studies
Articles containing video clips